Culebra Road is a street in Bexar County, Texas, near San Antonio. It is signed as part of three separate state highways:

  Texas State Highway Spur 421
  Farm to Market Road 471
  Farm to Market Road 3487